Martadoris oliva is a species of sea slug, a dorid nudibranch, a marine gastropod mollusk in the family Polyceridae.

Distribution
This species was described from Panama. It has been reported from South Carolina.

References

Polyceridae
Gastropods described in 1977